The 1961–62 Cypriot Cup was the 20th edition of the Cypriot Cup. A total of 23 clubs entered the competition. It began with the first round and concluded on 17 June 1962 with the final which was held at GSP Stadium. Anorthosis won their 3rd Cypriot Cup trophy after beating Olympiakos 5–2 in the final.

Format 
In the 1961–62 Cypriot Cup, participated the teams of the Cypriot First Division and the teams of the Cypriot Second Division.

The competition consisted of five knock-out rounds. In all rounds each tie was played as a single leg and was held at the home ground of the one of the two teams, according to the draw results. Each tie winner was qualifying to the next round. If a match was drawn, extra time was following. If extra time was drawn, there was a replay match.

First round

Second round

Quarter-finals

Semi-finals

Final

Sources

Bibliography

See also 
 Cypriot Cup
 1961–62 Cypriot First Division

Cypriot Cup seasons
1961–62 domestic association football cups
1961–62 in Cypriot football